Daniel Adam Stange (born December 22, 1985) is a former Major League Baseball pitcher. He has played in Major League Baseball (MLB) for the Arizona Diamondbacks and Los Angeles Angels of Anaheim.

Career
Stange attended Elsinore High School in Wildomar, California, and was drafted by the Atlanta Braves in the 33rd round of the 2003 MLB draft, but didn't sign.

Arizona Diamondbacks
He also attended the University of California, Riverside, and was drafted by the Arizona Diamondbacks in the 7th round (207th overall) of the 2006 Major League Baseball draft. He was assigned to Advanced Rookie Missoula, where in 27 appearances, he went 5-2 with a 4.25 ERA and 13 saves, striking out 48 in 36 innings.

Stange began the 2007 season with the High-A Visalia Oaks, where in 38 appearances, he went 4-5 with a 3.19 ERA and 16 saves, striking out 53 in 42.1 innings. He was named a California League All-Star, along with fellow Oak Brooks Brown. He was promoted to Double-A Mobile, where he pitched in 5 games before being shut down and undergoing Tommy John surgery. Stange began 2008 in June with Single-A South Bend, but was promoted in late July to Visalia. In 22 total appearances, he went 2-2 with a 2.64 ERA and 1 save, striking out 31 in 30.2 innings.

Stange spent 2009 with Mobile, where in 39 appearances, he went 0-4 with a 4.88 ERA and 10 saves, striking out 44 in 51.2 innings. On November 24, 2009, the Diamondbacks added Stange to the 40 man roster to protect him from the Rule 5 draft

Stange began 2010 with Triple-A Reno, but on May 29, Stange and Kevin Mulvey were recalled, replacing Kris Benson and Leo Rosales, who were placed on the disabled list. He made his debut that day, retiring all three batters he faced in the ninth against the Chicago Cubs. His first strikeout was of Ryan Theriot in his second appearance. On May 12, Stange was optioned to Reno, making room for Carlos Rosa. In July, he was demoted to Mobile, where he finished the season. In 4 games with the Diamondbacks, he gave up 6 run in 4 innings, striking out 2. After the season, Stange played with the Scottsdale Scorpions of the Arizona Fall League.

On January 18, 2011, Stange was designated for assignment, and was outrighted to Reno 8 days later. Stange played 2011 with Reno, where in he pitched in 25 games before missing the last month of the season due to injury. In 36.2 innings, he went 3-1 with a 6.14 ERA and 29 strikeouts. Stange began 2012 with Reno, but was released on April 18 after a poor start.

Bridgeport Bluefish
On April 29, Stange signed with the independent Bridgeport Bluefish of the Atlantic League. After pitching in 3 games for Bridgeport,

San Diego Padres
Stange had his contract purchased by the San Diego Padres on May 7. He was assigned to Double-A San Antonio, where he finished the season with. He also had a two-game stint with Triple-A Tucson. In 46 games with the Missions, he went 3-6 with a 3.35 ERA and 6 saves, striking out 64 in 53.2 innings.

On November 29, Stange signed a minor league deal with the Padres that included an invitation to Spring training. In 7 appearances with the Padres during spring training, he gave up 4 runs in 7 innings, striking out 7. Stange began 2013 with Tucson, where he pitched in 26 games before being opting out of his contract on June 17.

Los Angeles Angels
On June 22, Stange signed a minor league deal with the Los Angeles Angels of Anaheim, and was assigned to Triple-A Salt Lake. On July 29, Stange was called up by the Angels, replacing Brad Hawpe, who was designated for assignment. He was optioned back to Salt Lake on August 6 to make room for recently acquired Grant Green. In 3 games with Los Angeles, he gave up 3 runs in 1.2 innings with 1 strikeout. After not earning a call-up in September when the rosters expanded, he was outrighted off the Angels roster on September 22, 2013 and he subsequently elected free agency. In 26 games with Salt Lake, he went 4-1 with a 5.06 ERA, striking out 30 in 26.2 innings.

Washington Nationals
On November 21, 2013, Stange signed a minor league deal with the Washington Nationals with an invitation to Spring training. He became a free agent on September 4, 2014.

References

External links

1985 births
Living people
Arizona Diamondbacks players
Baseball players from California
Bridgeport Bluefish players
Criollos de Caguas players
Liga de Béisbol Profesional Roberto Clemente pitchers
Los Angeles Angels players
Major League Baseball pitchers
Missoula Osprey players
Mobile BayBears players
Navegantes del Magallanes players
American expatriate baseball players in Venezuela
People from Orange, California
People from Wildomar, California
Reno Aces players
Salt Lake Bees players
San Antonio Missions players
Scottsdale Scorpions players
South Bend Silver Hawks players
Syracuse Chiefs players
Tucson Padres players
UC Riverside Highlanders baseball players
Visalia Oaks players
Mat-Su Miners players